Cheshmeh Khosrow (also Romanized as Chashmeh-ye Khosrow; also known as Kānī Khosrow and Kāni Khusrān) is a village in Kivanat Rural District, Kolyai District, Sonqor County, Kermanshah Province, Iran. At the 2006 census, its population was 125, in 28 families.

References 

Populated places in Sonqor County